The 2009 Women's Hockey Champions Trophy was the 17th edition of the Hockey Champions Trophy for women. It was held between 11 and 19 July 2009 in Sydney, Australia.

Argentina won the tournament for the third time after defeating Australia 4–3 in the final on penalty strokes after a 0–0 draw.

Despite finishing runner-up, Australia were relegated from next year's tournament instead of the sixth-placed team England, due to England being the host of the 2010 edition. Relegation was decided based on rankings from the 2008 Olympics. Australian coach Frank Murray strongly criticised the rule, calling it "a ridiculous qualification process", upon discovering prior to the final that Australia would have to win the tournament to avoid relegation. He stated that the tournament's lowest-placed team bar the next hosts should instead be relegated, and noted that the rule incentivised Australia to deliberately lose to England, to help England to finish higher than sixth.

Teams
The International Hockey Federation announced the qualified teams for this event:
  (Defending champions)
  (Champions of 2008 Summer Olympics and champions of 2006 World Cup)
  (Host nation)
  (Second in 2008 Olympics)
  (Fourth 2008 Olympics)
  (Sixth in 2008 Olympics as Great Britain)

Umpires
Below are the 8 umpires appointed by the International Hockey Federation:

 Julie Ashton-Lucy (AUS)
 Marelize de Klerk (RSA)
 Christiane Hippler (GER)
 Lee Keum-ju (KOR)
 Lisette Klaassen (NED)
 Miao Lin (CHN)
 Lisa Roach (AUS)
 Wendy Stewart (CAN)

Results
All times are Eastern Standard Time (UTC+10:00)

Pool

Classification

Fifth and sixth place

Third and fourth place

Final

Awards

Statistics

Final standings

Goalscorers

References

External links
 Official FIH website

2009
Com
International women's field hockey competitions hosted by Australia
2009 in women's field hockey
International sports competitions hosted at Sydney Olympic Park
2000s in Sydney
July 2009 sports events in Australia